The Central Philippine University (also referred to as Central or CPU) is a private research university in Iloilo City, Philippines. Established in 1905 through a benevolent grant of the American industrialist and philanthropist, John D. Rockefeller, as the Jaro Industrial School and Bible School under the auspices of the American Baptist Foreign Mission Society, it is the first Baptist founded and second American and Protestant university in the Philippines and in Asia (after its sister institution Silliman University (1901) in Dumaguete). In 1913, women were first admitted to the school and it was later converted into a junior college in 1923 as Central Philippine School and as Central Philippine College in 1924. In 1953, the college attained university status. It is affiliated with the Convention of Philippine Baptist Churches but independent and non-sectarian.

Central's founding however is predated four years earlier in 1901, when CPU–Iloilo Mission Hospital, the university's hospital, was established by the Presbyterian American missionary doctor, Joseph Andrew Hall, as "the first and oldest American and Protestant founded hospital in the Philippines".

Central pioneered nursing education in the Philippines through the establishment of Union Mission Hospital Training School for Nurses in 1906 which later became Central Philippine University College of Nursing, the first nursing school in the country. It is also the first institution in Southeast Asia to establish a student council, the CPU Republic, the first to pioneer the work-study program in the country, and the first to established an agricultural school outside of Luzon, the CPU College of Agriculture, Resources and Environmental Sciences.

CPU is organized into eighteen schools and colleges that provides instruction in basic education all the way up to the post-graduate levels. In the tertiary education, the undergraduate level consists of the colleges of Agriculture, Resources and Environmental Sciences, Arts and Sciences, Business and Accountancy, Computer Studies, Education, Engineering, Hospitality Management; Medical Laboratory Science, Nursing, Pharmacy, and Theology. In the graduate level it comprises the schools and colleges of Law, Medicine, and Graduate Studies.

Central is one of the few Philippine higher education institutions to be ranked as best and top universities for Asia and the world by Quacquarelli Symonds, one of the big three international university ranking agencies along with Times Higher Education and Academic Ranking of World Universities. It is the first among other universities in the Western Visayas region to do so.

The Commission on Higher Education (CHED) has granted the university a full autonomous status. It is also the same government agency that awarded CPU as National Centers of Excellence in Business Administration and Agriculture and National Centers of Development in Chemical Engineering, Electrical Engineering, Electronics Engineering and Teacher Education. It has also been certified as one of the few ISO certified educational institutions in the Philippines by the International Organization for Standardization (ISO). Central's main campus on the other hand, is a registered National Landmark by the National Historical Commission of the Philippines and a Philippine Registered Cultural Property by the National Commission for Culture and the Arts.

Through its linkages with Chinese, Korean and Vietnamese universities, CPU also maintains overseas academic programs at those universities. It is the only university in Vietnam that offers undergraduate and post-graduate business courses jointly with Thai Nguyen University (TNU) and Thai Nguyen University of Economics and Business Administration (TUEBA).

Central alumni, faculty and affiliates have been recognized in a wide range of fields. These include numerous prominent politicians, National Artists of the Philippines, Fulbright Scholars and Professors, Scientists and inventors, Ramon Magsaysay Award (Asian Nobel Prize) and other prestigious awards laureates, Senators and Lower House Legislators, Presidential Cabinet Members, Associate and Chief Justices of the Supreme Court and Court of Appeals of the Philippines, foreign diplomats, military servicemen, Philippine provincial governors and cities mayors, novelists and writers, journalists, film directors and actors, Singers, and business tycoons.

History

Incorporation and founding
In the early 20th century when the Philippines was opened to the American Protestant missionaries prior and after the Philippines was ceded by Spain to the United States through the 1898 Treaty of Paris after the Spanish–American War, a comity agreement by the Protestant American churches was established that the Philippine islands will be divided into mission territories, thus the Western Visayan region went to the jurisdiction of the Baptists.

The origins of Central Philippine University dates back in 1901 when the American Northern Baptists, through its foreign mission board, the American Baptist Foreign Mission Society, laid a plan to establish mission schools following the comity agreement of the division of the islands for the evangelical mission and through a benevolent grant given by John D. Rockefeller, an American industrialist and philanthropist. John D. Rockefeller himself was a devoted Northern Baptist with numerous church related philanthropy works throughout his life, that is why he gave a grant to the Northern Baptists that resulted in the establishment of Central.

On the other hand, in 1901 also, four years before the founding of Central in 1905, alongside when the American Baptists came in Iloilo, the Presbyterians came and they established the Union Mission Hospital (Sabine Haines Memorial Union Mission Hospital) (which Central, since its founding until this day is closely associated with as its university hospital) under the Presbyterian Church in the United States by Joseph Andrew Hall, it is the first Protestant and American hospital in the Philippines. Since the hospital's founding, Presbyterians worked closely with the Baptists for the operation of the hospital. Following the years since its founding, in 1925, its administration was eventually transferred to the Baptists who also bought the land in the City of Jaro (now part and a district of Iloilo City) where the hospital now stands. The hospital was later renamed to Iloilo Mission Hospital in 1932. The hospital predates the schools founding by four years. It also serves since then as the hospital of Central. The hospital pioneered the Nursing education in the Philippines when it established the Union Mission Hospital Training School for Nurses (the present Central Philippine University College of Nursing) in 1906. The school also produced the first graduate nurses in the country.

Then in 1903, there will be two schools that will be established by the mission: an industrial school for boys and a Bible school to train pastors and other Christian workers was incorporated. Later, it was voted on December 2, 1904, to finally establish the two schools. The task to found both schools was given to William O. Valentine, an American missionary, who became the first principal and president with the help of the other co-founders. Valentine was in the service of the American Baptist Foreign Mission Society, where he first ministered as a missionary in Burma, first in Rangoon, then in Mandalay, where he became the principal of the Baptist Mission High School for Boys in 1895. The new mission was given to him by the mission society in 1903. During his eighth year in Burma he suffered severe sunstroke and returned to America for treatment. There he met his future wife, nurse Ina Jane Van Allen. Valentine and Van Allen were married in 1903 and the couple left for his new appointment in Iloilo in the Philippines.

The establishment of the Baptist Missionary Training School and the Jaro Industrial School is associated with the first Baptist Church in the Philippine Islands, the Jaro Evangelical Church, which was established on February 28, 1900, by the Northern American Baptists also, now the American Baptist Churches. In June 1, 1905, the Bible School opened in the home of the Valentines under the auspices of the American Baptist Foreign Mission Society from the United States along with other missionaries that are considered as co-founders. There were 12 pupils with some "Bible Women" who attended as auditors.

The benevolent grant given by the industrialist and oil magnate John D. Rockefeller, was used to provide the school the facilities during the school's establishment along with the industrial school (which was later established in the fall of 1905) and to purchase a 24-hectare piece of land in the City of Jaro (now a part of Iloilo City) where Central's main campus is located at present.

In the fall of 1905, the Jaro Industrial School was opened as a free vocational boarding school for poor boys. The first class consisted of 20 boys who worked four hours a day to pay their tuition, room and board, and spent four hours in the classroom. One of the school's innovations was the adoption of student self-government, the first in the South East Asia, known today as Central Philippine University Republic, which is modeled on American civil government. Dr. William Orison Valentine, worked for its incorporation and recognition by the Philippine Government. A year later when Jaro Industrial School was established, one of the school's innovations was the adoption of student self-government which is modeled on American civil government, the Jaro Industrial School Republic. The Republic continues to this day as the Central Philippine University Republic. It still holds the distinction as the oldest student governing body in South East Asia. The original purpose of the founding of the industrial school for boys was quoted a century later in 2005 during the centennial celebrations of the university:

"The original purpose of the school (Jaro Industrial School) was to provide opportunity for poor Filipino boys to receive a good Christian education by working their way through school. Actual work experience and earnest study of the Bible were the core of the curriculum."

Later the leadership of the Bible School was turned over to the Reverend Henry Munger, who conducted classes off campus. In 1907, Reverend William Valentine became and tenured again as head of the Jaro Industrial School. By 1907 during his term, there were 300 boys working an active farm and in various trades. All of this students were required to live on campus. In 1907 also, the Bible School split off under a separate principal, Dr. Eric Lund. Classes were held at the Mission Press building where Lund was doing his Scripture translation work.

In 1910, independent student media at the Jaro Industrial School created the first official student publication, The Hoe (the present Central Echo). It is now one of the oldest student publications in the Philippines.

In 1912, Dr. Lund left the Baptist Missionary Training School and it was closed. Following that year, in 1913, Dr. Valentine's objectives were realized and in the same year the Jaro Industrial School also admitted its first female student; it was fully incorporated then by the Philippine government and enrolled 740 students. Then in 1915, Jaro Industrial School opened its first high school program, starting with first and second year classes, adding third and fourth year classes in 1920. As both two schools were founded by the Northern American Baptists from the American Baptist Churches, ordination for women is affirmed that resulted and eventually in 1917, the Jaro Industrial School elected its first female head and Principal, Mary J. Thomas, who tenured as a Principal of the Jaro Industrial School from 1917 to 1918. The Baptist Missionary Training School later however was reopened in 1913 by Rev. Alton Bigelow. It was under Rev. Alton Bigelow's leadership that the Bible School began to have a definite direction in its development. In 1921, the following year after the Jaro Industrial School added fourth year high school classes, the school graduated its first high school batch.

The first Board of Trustees which was formed a year earlier before the founding of the two schools, is composed of five members from the mission conference which are selected by the mission conference in annual session. They remained American in composition until prior to the conversion of the Jaro Industrial School as a junior college. In the early years of the school's operation, building up qualified faculty and staff had been a great challenge. Some missionaries gave part-time service and Dr. David S. Hibbard, founder of the Silliman Institute, now Silliman University, also provided Filipino instructors who had trained at Silliman Institute.

To accommodate the need for tertiary education in the area, a junior college was opened in 1923 and the name of the school was changed to Central Philippine College. In April of the following year, the Baptist Missionary Training School became an organic part of the junior College. The senior college opened in 1936 and by 1940 five degrees were offered: Bachelor of Arts, Bachelor of Science, Bachelor of Education, Bachelor of Theology and Bachelor of Religious Education.

When the junior college became a senior college in 1936, the College of Engineering was also established.

In 1938, Baptist Missionary Training School (BMST) for women which was established independently on October 20, 1905, became part of the theology department of the college. In the same year also, students and interested sectors of the school began to press for the opening of a law school. Finally, on March 18, 1939, the Board of Trustees voted to apply for a permit to offer the first two years of the law course. It opened in the school year 1939–1940. Attorney Pablo Oro, who had been one of the leaders in urging this move and in seeking patrons to help develop the law library, was given the responsibility for developing the program. Pablo Oro, a member of the Philippine Bar, was a graduate of Silliman University and of the University of Manila College of Law.

On September 19, 1931, the Union Mission Hospital started admitting and treating patients in its present location on Mission Road. The hospital plant occupied a lot 29,283 meters or approximately 3 hectares in area. On October 21, 1931, became a joyous day. The new relocated hospital was dedicated with its founder, Dr. Joseph Andrew Hall came all the way from Tacloban City, Leyte, as the guest of honor on the said momentous occasion. Dr. Precy Grigg lost no time in developing the new hospital's buildings and its surroundings. On what used to be a deep rice field and swampy place was a green lawn and rose garden surrounding the new imposing and neat-looking concrete hospital. After office hours, Dr. Grigg loved to work on landscaping the surroundings with plants secured from the islands of Negros and Panay.

On March 5, 1932, Union Mission Hospital (UMH) became the Iloilo Mission Hospital (IMH). Likewise the training school was renamed Iloilo Mission Hospital Training School for Nurses (IMHTSN). The hospital onwards continued to grow. It drew students from many parts of the Philippine islands who came to apply for admission to the training school for nurses.

World War II

Academic life in the campus was interrupted when invading Japanese forces landed in Iloilo. As a consequence of the invasion, missionaries assigned at Central fled and took refuge in the mountain barrios of Katipunan, Tapaz, Capiz. They hid in the forest they called "Hopevale" with the help of their Filipino friends. They were eventually captured by the Japanese troops on December 19, 1943. The missionaries begged them to free the Filipino captives and instead offered themselves as ransom. At the dawn of December 20, 1943, the missionaries asked to be allowed to pray and, an hour later, they told their Japanese captors they were ready to die. The adults were beheaded and the children were bayoneted.

The missionaries who died in the massacre are today called the Hopevale Martyrs. The martyrs are: Dr. Francis Howard Rose (former President and head of Central), Jeanie Clare Adams, Prof. James Howard Clovell, Charma Moore Clovell, Dorothy Antoinette Dowell, Signe Amelia Erikson, Dr. Frederick Willer-Meyer, Ruth Schatch Meyer, Gertrude Coombs Rose, Rev. Erle Frederich Rounds, Louise Cummings Rounds, and Erle Douglas. Despite the order that these Americans should go home because of the war, they refused to leave their mission and eventually sacrificed their lives.

On the day Pearl Harbor was bombed on in December 1941, the American Baptist Foreign Mission and its affiliate Woman's American Baptist Foreign Mission Society had 21 missionaries in the Philippine islands. The mission works of the American Baptists had been rocked during the height of the World War II. On December 15, 1941, the two mission hospitals run by the mission on Panay – Iloilo Mission Hospital and Capiz Emmanuel Hospital, began to work in full co-operation with the United States Armed Forces. By January 1942, Manila had fallen in the hands of the Japanese Imperial Army and had become clear that they would come to Panay. The two hospitals moved to separate inland areas, the Capiz Emmanuel Hospital to Dumalag, Capiz and the Iloilo Mission Hospital to Calinog, Iloilo where, April 1942, they continued to operate under their regular missionary and Filipino staffmen drawing more heavily on the armed forces for equipment and supplies.

Post-war years and reconstruction

After the war ended, the college was reopened by the remaining members of the faculty and by returning missionaries. When the Second World War broke out, the college's buildings were destroyed. Reconstruction was made possible through funds from friends at home and abroad.

The college's Graduate School was formally opened in 1951 with Dr. Linnea A. Nelson as dean. Dr. Nelson, holder of an Ed.D degree from the University of California, Berkeley, had been a missionary in China from 1935 to 1949. Since its founding, the graduate school has been chosen by the fund for Assistance to Private Education (FAPE) as a graduate center for MBA, MA in English and Master of Engineering for the following fields of specialization: civil engineering, chemical engineering, electrical engineering, and mechanical engineering.

When the war ended, Dr. Henry S. Waters, the postwar director of Iloilo Mission Hospital and also principal of the Iloilo Mission Hospital School of Nursing in 1946–1947, pressed for the offering, with Central Philippine College (the forerunner of Central Philippine University), a collegiate course leading to the Bachelor of Science in Nursing degree. The director of the Bureau of Private Schools and the members of the board of examiners for nurses authorized the opening of the Bachelor of Science in Nursing four-year course in 1947 that resulted the school's operation transferred to the college.

Dr. Waters served as acting dean of the new College of Nursing at Central Philippine College (1947–1948). When he returned to the United States, Dr. Teofilo Marte served as the executive secretary (1948–1949). Loreto D. Tupaz, who finished her Bachelor of Science in Nursing degree at CPU, was the acting dean from 1949 to 1950 and served in this capacity until the arrival of Esther Salzman, Master of Science in Nursing and an American Baptist Foreign Mission Society missionary nurse, who held the deanship from 1950 to 1961. During her term, the college offered three curricular programs: the Bachelor of Science in Nursing four-year course, the GN-Bachelor of Science in Nursing Supplemental Course and the Bachelor of Science in Nursing five-year course.

Tupaz and Salzman worked together to develop Central Philippine College of Nursing (later the Central Philippine University College of Nursing) into a college of distinction, recognized both in the Philippines and abroad.  Salzman served as dean until 1961 when she retired in the United States. Lily Plagata, MSN, was appointed to the deanship (1961–1974). When she resigned and went abroad, she was replaced by Carmen Centeno, Master of Science, for the remaining months of 1963. Centeno, however, also left for the United States, and Loreto D. Tupaz, who finished her MA degree at CPU, resumed the deanship (1963–1970), assisted by Maria Pablico, MSN (1969–1970). Pablico also resigned to work in the United States from 1963 to 1973. Tupaz continued to administer the three course programs of the college, the Bachelor of Science in Nursing five-year course, the CCT (Clinical Teaching) course, and the Bachelor of Science in Nursing Supplemental Course.

Post world war pushed for the expansion of the university's programs including in the field of healthcare sciences. In 1947 saw the need for CPU to open a dentistry and pharmacy programs.

The plan for a College of Pharmacy was presented by Mr. Plagata in response, as he said, "to insistent demands from a number of students." He reported that an outlay of 9,000 Pesos would cover the initial cosrlt because some equipment was already available in the Chemistry Department. The board voted to apply for a permit for the first two years if the college administration found it feasible. The administration at once made formal application for the permit, and this was given by the Bureau. The third year in Pharmacy was opened in 1948, and by 1949 four years of Pharmacy was offered, with Carmelina Jalbuena as dean.

Mr. Plagata reported that Dr. Emilio Gatanela, a prominent practicing dentist, had encouraged the Faculty Council to propose a College of Dentistry in response to requests for its opening, after pointing out that such program would not necessitate considerable outlay. He stated that local dentists could be employed as instructors and they would lend their equipment. In it was voted to open the College of Dentistry. In early 1950s however due to the cost the university may cover for its expansion for a modern school of dentistry, it was formally closed.

On April 1, 1953, the college gained government recognition and was given a university charter, converting the college into what is now known as the Central Philippine University.

In July 1955, the Hon. Robert Simmons, the former Chief Justice of the Nebraska State Court, visited the campus and lectured to the students. He became very much interested in the former law school Dean Atty. Pablo Oro and the College of Law. Justice Simmons gave generous support to the law school's library and encouraged his friends and colleagues to do the same.

In 1965, Central's College of Engineering offered a one-year Sanitary engineering course with three graduates. One could only enroll in this course after completing the Civil Engineering course. However, this restriction was abolished later due to an insufficient number of enrollees. In 1956, after three years when the college received a university charter from the Philippine government, the first female President, Linnea A. Nelson, was elected.

On the other hand, Linnea Nelson became the first female university president, she was the person behind the establishment of the School of Graduate Studies back in 1951, where she was the first dean of the school. Nelson is an Ed.D degree holder from the University of California, Berkeley, and had been a missionary in China from 1935 to 1949. She served as the president of Central from 1956 to 1957 and was again re-elected in 1965–1966.

From its founding, Filipinos were gradually given larger responsibilities in its administration. In 1966 the first Filipino president, Dr. Rex D. Drilon, a CPU alumnus and a Political Scientist from the University of the Philippines Diliman, was elected. Dr. Drilon began initiatives for the Filipinization of the university, and made a trip to the United States for the purpose. The American Baptist Foreign Mission Society consented to transfer the multi-million University properties to the Filipinos in consonance with the Foreign Mission policy of "Americans receding and Filipinos advancing". Thus, in 1968 the entire university property – land, buildings, and equipment – was turned over by the American Baptist Foreign Mission Society to the Filipino corporation of CPU. Since 1973, all members of the board of trustees and administrative officials of the university have been Filipinos.

1990s and recent history

In 1998 until 2008, the 3rd Filipino president of the university, Dr. Juanito Acanto term was dubbed as Years of Bliss: Years of Fulfillment, where academic and infrastructural developments flourished in the university, through help from the alumni. It was in his term also, when the university started a goal to raise 100 million Php and as planned, the campaign started in September 2001 until December 2005. The CPU Centennial Development Fund alone raised a total of 75,000,000 pesos from 182 Endowment programs. The helpful endeavor through other endowment fund programs, which started years back, was intensified and is still ongoing, with a total of 433 Endowment Funds, amounting to 127,500,000 pesos until May of his last year term as the university president in 2007; celebrated its centennial year in 2005, where thousands of alumni from the world came home. The university's centennial celebration and followed by the foundation day on October 1 owes a lot to the American founders and missionaries who founded and sacrificed for Central, especially to the Reverend William Valentine, the founding father of the institution.

CPU–Iloilo Mission Hospital, the university hospital of Central in 2001, celebrated its centennial, commemorating its century of existence and its contribution since its founding in 1901 to the Philippine and American colonial history in the Philippines and in Asia as it pioneered the Nursing education in the Philippines, as the first Protestant founded hospital in the country and the second American hospital in Asia. The centennial building was inaugurated in the hospital area proper and the hospital acquisition of the Philips MX8000 CT Scan machine, the first of its kind in South East Asia

Augmented amounts from the Centennial Development Fund and the help of various individuals, was used to build and expand the various structures on the main campus, such as the Dr. Alfonso A. Uy – Student Union Building, a four-storey commercial building built through the fund and by Dr. Alfonso A. Uy (an alumnus of the university) on the campus, to help augment its operational expenses, and to further raise its financial base; CPU Lifestyle Learning Center (prior to the students and the people who wanted to manage their fitness lifestyle); and the CPU Alumni Promenade and Concert Park, which is structurally attached to the also newly built CPU Alumni Center, CPU Alumni Affairs Office, Educational Media Center (where the CPU TV Channel and Radio broadcasts still to this day) and the CPU Dining Hall, and the CPU Excel Center.

The Board of International Ministries of the American Baptist Churches has awarded Central a School of Excellence award.

Also, in the school year 2000–2001, the Central Philippine University College of Engineering introduced the Bachelor of Science in Software Engineering. This has earned the college another place in Engineering History in the Philippines. It is the first engineering school in the country to offer the course. On August 15, 2001, also, Dr. Ted Robles (BSEE 1964) (the present university president) and a former Milwaukee School of Engineering professor conducted a national seminar on a digital logic software known as the Altera Max + Plus II which was attended by different engineering schools in the Philippines and hosted by the Electrical Engineering and Electronics and Communications Engineering department of Central Philippine University College of Engineering.

The College of Engineering hosted the first-ever National Congress on Civil Engineering. Then, a seminar workshop was held featuring Dr. Stephen Agunlana from Asian Institute of Technology as guest professor. This was followed by the two more Civil Engineering Seminars, this time featuring alumni, namely, Asian Institute of Technology based Engr. Henry Abiera (College Alumnus) on Geotechnical engineering, and Engr. Vicente Golveo (BSCE 1957) from the United States of America on Structural Engineering. Seminars on Instrumentation and Micro Controllers were undertaken with Dr. Teodoro Robles (College of Alumnus and present university president), also from the United States of America, as resource person.

One of the other prominent infrastructural developments during Dr. Juanito Acanto's term as a president, is the establishment of the university's own Television Channel, the CPU TV Channel. The television channel, launched in 2001 under its former names, EXCEL TV, then was changed to CPU Alumni Channel in 2005, and to CPU TV Channel, is the first university–based cable TV channel in Asia, is one big leap in upholding the university's standard in quality education through the use of mass media. There were various new real properties also that is owned by the university when he was in his term as the President. The 24 hectares San Rafael Agricultural Land and the  Guimaras Agricultural Land

Central gained much attention and was lauded by various business and technology sectors in the field of Engineering, through its pioneer Packaging Engineering program and department in the College of Engineering, being the first such in the country and in Asia, organized and hosted the first National Conference in Transport Packaging in 2007 it was then followed also by the first Philippine International Packaging Conference, the Global Pack 2012. Thomas Schneider, President and CEO of the 51-member nation World Packaging Organization, is one of the delegates of the Global Pack 2012 event along with various people from other countries, government agencies and business sector. Along with the Global Pack 2012 conference, a packaging engineering testing center and laboratory and value-added facility of a UN-compliant and comprehensive was donated by US Packaging Hall of Famer and Department of Science and Technology (DOST-Philippines) Balik Scientist Dr. Lejo Brana, is also the first of its kind in the Southeast Asian region, the CPU Philippine Center for Packaging Engineering and Technology (CPU-PC PET). The center is backed by the Department of Science and Technology, the industry's Packaging Institute of the Philippines and a private sector's packaging advocate, Systemat-PackEDGE.

The university currently expanded its numbers of programs in business, agriculture, and medical and [[health sciences]] and the recent re-establishment of the pharmacy department. The International Organization for Standardization (ISO), prior to the university as an ISO Certified Institution, recently conducted an external audit and surveillance for the university's renewal of ISO certification, based on the new standard. The university last upgraded its certification last 2010. The said University's certification, covers educational and support which is up to year 2013. Recently, through international collaborations with other institutions has made CPU to offer undergraduate programs in Business Administration and Accountancy, graduate programs in Business Administration and Public Administration, and doctorate degree in Management program at Thai Nguyen University (TNU) and Thai Nguyen University of Economics and Business Administration (TUEBA) both in Vietnam.

The university acquired also a Level IV accreditation status (the highest level of accreditation that could be given to an individual academic program in the Philippines) from Association of Christian Schools, Colleges and Universities (ACSCU) in the programs of Business Administration, Accountancy and Education, among others, has made it the top university in the Western Visayan region with programs that has a said accreditation status and level. It ranks first in the Philippines in terms of tertiary academic programs with Level III level status. The university also ranks first among other universities based on Centers of Development and Excellence list in Western Visayas, where six of its programs designated by the Commission on Higher Education (Philippines) as Centers of Development and Center of Excellence, while the Department of Science and Technology designated its Civil Engineering program as Center for Civil Engineering Education. Central is one of the two leaders in the Visayas and Mindanao based on endowment funding, with 182 Endowment programs and a total of 433 Endowment funds in 2007 that is still on-going and expanding still to this day.

In 2019, it had 7,673 students.

In November 2020, the university's long continued run in academic excellence has resulted for it to be ranked by Quacquarelli Symonds in its list of Top Universities in Asia and the World for 2021, the first highed education institution to do so in the Western Visayas region. CPU placed in the 601+ bracket ranking (8th place in bracket ranking and 13th place in numbering in the Philippines) among other Asian universities in the list. Quacquarelli Symonds or QS is one of the big three world university ranking agencies along with Times Higher Education (THE) and Academic Ranking of World Universities (ARWU).

In December in the said year, Central has also been admitted as a member institution of Southeast Asian Ministers of Education Organization Schools Network (SEAMEO Schools Network) to further enhance its research and academic capabilities in the international stage.

Campus

Central has an overall total combined land area of 200 hectares (469.5 acres), which composed of the Main Campus (24 hectares), CPU Hopevale Agricultural Extension Land (95.8 hectares), CPU Zarraga Farm and Research Campus (19.3 hectares), CPU Leon Experimental Farm and Research Campus (7 hectares), CPU Centennial Village (10 hectares), the CPU–Iloilo Mission Hospital (3 hectares), CPU-FA (Faculty Association) Heritage Ville Subdivision (4.7) San Rafael Land (24 hectares) and Guimaras Land (14 hectares).

The CPU's main campus sits on a 24 hectare (59.30 acres) of land in the former city of Jaro which is now a district of Iloilo City, the largest in Iloilo City. The main campus's vital location set between the Tigum River and Dungon Creek is laid back-urban. It is near from necessary contacts yet far away from the distraction of metropolis's noise and dust of the progressive and bustling city center of Iloilo. The city, which has been dubbed as the Asia's City of Love or City of Love and Emerging Museum City of the Philippines, is the last capital of Spanish Empire in Asia and the Pacific, hence the Spanish influence could be seen elsewhere especially in the broad spectrum such as the culture and traditions.

The main campus's 24 hectare land was bought through the benevolent grant of the American industrialist and philanthropist, John D. Rockefeller, to the American Baptist Foreign Mission Society to built mission school in the Philippines. From a swampy land where the school was started in 1905, it grew to a campus housing more than thirty structures, and is a veritable community by itself surrounded by different barrios. Several tree species such as Palm and acacia trees dots the entire main campus, a unique feature the university has.

Some of the structures on the main campus which were built during early American colonial period, possesses designs of the said period. The main campus which follows a typical university plan found in the universities in the United States and in Europe has a wide and big green open spaces or yards bounded on the sides with edifices, a character unique to CPU and a factor for a campus being conducive to learning.

The campus is flanked by various gates. The second gate is the main entrance. It bears the university's motto, Scientia et Fides which in English means Science and Faith. Central is a registered national historical landmark by the Philippine government cultural agency of National Historical Commission of the Philippines. Central has been declared by the local government unit of Iloilo City as Tourist site and is the only university in the Western Visayas region recommended for tourists as a place of interest, attraction and landmark to visit by the largest travel site in the world, the Trip Advisor. Central has been also hailed as the second of all the 18 beautiful college campuses in the Philippines by an American internet media company BuzzFeed.

By architectural order, the CPU Church is the tallest building on the main campus and meant by the planners as a "central and dominant feature" of the main campus proper. The church is notable noted for its Malay design and is a famous landmark in Iloilo City. Henry Luce III Library is one of the largest libraries in the Philippines with more than a quartered of a million volume holdings. Inside the Henry Luce III Library is the Meyer Asian Collection holdings of artifacts and other museum and art exhibitions.

Other buildings on the main campus include the Rose Memorial Auditorium or Rose. Rose was built to replace the old Rose Memorial Hall which was burned down by a fire in 1991. The Rose Memorial Auditorium is the largest theater in Western Visayas and has been a famous venue for different international and local kinds of musical and band concerts and conventions in Iloilo. Rose was the first annual venue of the prestigious national Bombo Music Festival when during its early years since it was established. Recently, the Cultural Center of the Philippines has designated the Rose Memorial Auditorium for three-year Memorandum of Understanding, as one of the first batch of nine Cultural Center of the Philippines Regional Art Centers or Kaisa sa Sining Regional Art Centers in 2014, which is the only one in Western Visayas region.

Notable residential halls on the main campus include the Johnson Hall which houses the only residential-academic college in the university, the College of Theology; the Weston Hall, a dormitory for women; Franklin Hall, a residential hall for men; the Missionary Hall, a co-ed apartment type residence; and the Roselund Hall (Hostel). There are several residential houses and halls in the American Village which caters for the foreign students who are studying at the university.

The Roblee Science Hall serves as a laboratory building for the science and laboratory experiment classes of the colleges and departments of Medical Laboratory Sciences, Pharmacy, and Chemistry (also, General subjects of other colleges held classes in Roblee Science Hall). Valentine Hall, is a monument to Central's founder, William Valentine, a Baptist missionary. It now houses the Colleges of Education and Arts and Sciences of the university

The main campus as a locally declared tourism site, the university maintains a team of landscapers and gardeners. It is enhanced by parks, gazebos, gardens and open spaces, including the Big Field, Half Moon, Alumni Garden, Santos Park, Nuñez Centennial Garden, Caipang Tree Park, Rex A. Drilon Millenium Park, the Glen at the Catedral, the Prayer Garden, the CPU-CAS Butterfly Garden, and the University Botanical Garden.

Annually, the university showcases the Festival of Lights and Music at Central, a joint project of the university and the CPU Alumni Association. The event features lighted figurines, trees and buildings, nativity scenes, and colorful lanterns attracting thousands of local and foreign tourists during the Christmas season. The Opening of Lights (Festival of Lights and Music at Central) remains one of the notable features of the CPU campus.  It opens in first week of December and is highlighted with a fireworks display on the opening ceremony. Lighted trees, buildings and figurines, Pampanga, Capiz shells and native lanterns placed along the major campus roads and nativity scenes add to its festive atmosphere.

The Central Philippine University–Iloilo Mission Hospital (CPU–Iloilo Mission Hospital), located more than a kilometer away south of the main campus in the district of Jaro, Iloilo City, sits on a 3 hectares of land. A tertiary, teaching and academic hospital, it serves as the university hospital of Central for its medical care and laboratory and clinical training center for the university's medical and allied health sciences students.

Further north, in Katipunan, Tapaz, in the province of Capiz, is the  Hopevale land of the university being utilized and to be developed into an instruction, research and extension of the College of Agriculture, Resources and Environmental Sciences (CARES). The  CPU Zarraga Farm (in the municipality of Zarraga, Iloilo) which is also under the said agricultural college and is separate from the university's main campus, hosts being an agricultural farm for research and extension. The CPU Crop Research Laboratory and other agricultural research facilities and equipment of the agricultural college are located in the CPU Zarraga Farm. The CPU Experimental Farm in Leon, Iloilo, which is under the college also is the site of the CPU Center for Research, Technology Development and Commercial Production of Philippine Native Chicken (CPU CRTDCPPNC), the largest research center for Philippine Native Chicken in the Philippines is located. The university villages for faculties and administration members of Central, the  CPU Centennial Village (Aganan, Pavia, Iloilo) and 4.7 hectare CPU-Faculty Association (FA) Heritage Ville Subdivision (Anilao, Pavia), are located also separately from the main campus which are both located in the municipality of Pavia, Iloilo, north of the main campus. CPU has also properties in San Rafael, Iloilo (24 hectares) and in Guimaras (14 hectares) serving as agricultural or lands for future expansion of the university.

In the 1930s, the Lopez family of Iloilo through Don Ramon Lopez, donated a piece of 30,000 square meters (3 hectares) land west of Dungon Creek in Mandurriao for the establishment of the CPU College of Medicine. It was supposedly to be named as Ramon Lopez Campus but the establishment of the medical school did not materialized until 2003.

CPU's physical plant of campuses and properties are under the jurisdiction and management of the university. The 3 hectare CPU-Iloilo Mission Hospital on the other hand which is separate from the main campus, has its own Board of Trustees and Corporation independent from Central Philippine University.

Sustainability

CPU's main campus buildings are predominantly painted with eco-friendly lighter shade green color for environmental consciousness and green campus initiative plans for sustainability. The university has laid in place an Air Quality Monitoring System unit, which monitors air quality and the only unit that serves the City of Iloilo. The unit is operated jointly by the university with the Department of Environment and Natural Resources.

In 2011, the university's continued efforts in sustainability yielded when it won the Regional Tertiary Level of the National Search for Sustainable and Eco-friendly Schools of the Department of Environment and Natural Resources - Environmental Management Bureau.  The said award paved the way for the university's nomination in the national level of the said prize. The award is given to schools, colleges and universities who have shown excellence through the campus sustainability programs it has.

The campus is dotted with nearly centuries old acacia, anahaw and royal palm trees in the whole stretch of CPU's main campus. Two large lush and green open spaces, the Big Field and Halfmoon are the university's green yards, equivalent to what some of universities campuses in western countries has. The university's campus bautification program oversees the maintenance of the university's gardens and park.

The other sustainability programs of the university on the campus include a waste water treatment facility for the waste water that is emitted then will be processed to a safer level before it will be dump back to the environment by the main campus buildings. Back in 2005, the university also launched the CPU New Millennium Tree (CPU NMT) for Sustainable Development. The said program is designed to heighten environmental consciousness on the university, where it seeks to plant thousands of mahogany trees.

Administration

The Central Philippine University is governed by a corporation under a non-stock and non-profit entity as Central Philippine University, Corporation. The university is administered by a Board of Trustees with members representing the Convention of Philippine Baptist Churches.

CPU–Iloilo Mission Hospital, the university's hospital, is also represented automatically in the university's corporation by its hospital director. Historically Protestant and maintaining an affiliation with the Convention of Philippine Baptist Churches and fraternal ties with the American Baptist Churches USA,  Central is independent in governance and academically non-sectarian, imposing no religious requirement on the admission of students.

The CPU Board of Trustees' structure and the corporation is headed by a chairman and vice-chairman alongside the university president, the vice-president for administration and finance, the vice-president for student affairs, and the vice-president for academic affairs (and research). The General Secretary of the Convention of Philippine Baptist Churches sits as an ex-officio member. The CPU Alumni Association, the faculty, and staff are likewise represented on the Board. The president of the university's student government, the CPU Republic, sits as a representative of the students.

The incumbent and 17th president (and also the 4th Filipino president) of the university is Teodoro C. Robles. An alumnus of the university, he studied engineering and graduated in 1964. Dr. Teodoro C. Robles also earned his M.S. and Doctor of Philosophy (Ph.D.) degrees in Electrical Engineering at Montana State University.

The Board of Trustees unanimously elected him on September 5, 2008, to be the new president and was confirmed by the CPU Corporation in a special meeting on September 18, 2008.

CPU–Iloilo Mission Hospital is a separate entity from the university. Its board of trustees is independent of CPU's corporation but largely composed of personnel from the university. Former CPU president, Juanito Maca Acanto, seats as the chairman of CPU–Iloilo Mission Hospital Corporation and Board of Trustees.

Central Philippine University maintains ties as a sister school with Silliman University in Dumaguete, the first American and Protestant-founded university in the Philippines and in Asia.

Academics

Rankings

Notably, Central Philippine University has been ranked by Quacquarelli Symonds (QS) as one of the best and top Asian and global universities since 2021, the first and only university to be included in the rankings from the Western Visayas region. In 2021, CPU ranked 601 in 2021, 651+ in 2022, and 701-750 in 2023. Such ranking put the university in the 8th place among the Philippine universities included in the list of the said agency's ranking for 2022  and 2023. It is the 3rd Visayan university to enter the said ranking after and Silliman University (the sister school of CPU) and Cebu Technological University. The recognition signified CPU's standing as world-class institution in the global academic arena bounded on exemplary 
education in the aspects of research, academics, local and foreign student and faculty population diversity, linkages, and designations. QS is one of the considered big three and prestigious world university ranking agencies along with Times Higher Education (THE) and Academic Ranking of World Universities (ARWU).

In 2006, the university ranks No. 1 in the Western Visayas region and No. 5 in the whole country in terms of high passing rates in various licensure examinations given by the Professional Regulation Commission. But later than that, in 2007, a report by PRC and CHED covering a five-year period (1994–1998) named the top 10 performing schools in the country based on PRC exams and Central Philippine University ranks number 8th. CPU holds the distinction as No. 1 in the Philippines in the number of tertiary academic programs accredited Level III by the Federation of Accrediting Agencies of the Philippines. In engineering, the College of Engineering ranks 10th of 25 Top Engineering Schools in the Philippines. Based also on that is the demonstration of the highest degree or level of standards along the areas of instruction, research and extension.

In 2009, the Commission on Higher Education of the Philippines released a report showing the Top 20 nursing schools in country based on average passing rates in nursing board examinations. Central ranks 6th having an average of 86.72.

Data released by Commission on Higher Education (Philippines) of top Universities based on Center of Excellence and Center of Development (as of October 4, 2010) for engineering courses, CPU ranks 10th of 25 Top Engineering Schools. Based on that data also is the demonstration of the highest degree or level of standards along the areas of instruction, research, and extension. 
Also, based on Professional Regulation Commission (Philippines) board exam passing rates, the university's College of Engineering was listed and ranks 9th in the Philippines.

uniRank, formerly 4 International Colleges & Universities, has ranked Central 1st in Western Visayas and 24th among 232 top universities in the Philippines for 2021. uniRank is the official web portal of international colleges and universities, an international higher education search engine and directory which reviews over 11,000 Colleges and Universities in 200 countries around the globe. Tertiary Education Schools should be duly recognized, licensed, and accredited by national ministries of education or higher education accrediting organizations before they qualify and get listed on 4icu.org. Furthermore, the organization maintains and religiously updates the profiles of the schools included in its list to protect the quality of the information contained in its directory. uniRank is a non-academic ranking body and thus it is not used to measure the academic standards of the organization. It aims to help international students know which university or college is popular in a specific country based on the popularity of their websites, which could be used as a reference in selecting a higher education organization.

Recognitions

In aspect of academic and non-academic designations, Central has been designated by various local, national, international and government agencies. The College of Engineering has been designated by the Department of Science and Technology as the only engineering School for Western Visayas while the College of Agriculture, Resources and Environmental as Commission on Higher Education (Philippines) – National Agriculture and Fisheries Education System (CHED-NAFES) as one of the Center of Excellence for Agricultural Education in the country. The basic education department of High School is also designated as the sole Department of Science and Technology – Engineering and Science Education Program (DOST-ESEP) Division Leader School for Western Visayas region and likewise it is one of the 15 Network High Schools in the Philippines.

The Commission on Higher Education has also granted the university a full autonomy status (one of the few in the Philippines) and it is one of the few International Organization for Standardization (ISO) certified institutions in the country in which its academic programs, instruction, research and extension programs, and facilities are in accordance with or of international standards.

Central has been accredited by various accreditation agencies like the Association of Christian Schools, Colleges and Universities (ACSCU) where it is a founding member also, the Philippine Accrediting Association of Schools, Colleges and Universities (PAASCU), and the Association of Christian Universities and Colleges in Asia (ACUCA), while the Association for Theological Education in South East Asia (ATESEA) solely for the university's College of Theology. In terms of accreditation status, the university ranks first in Western Visayas and third in the Philippines, with 15 of its programs designated as Level IV (the highest level of accreditation in the Philippines that can be granted to an individual program) in the programs of Accountancy, Business Administration, Social Sciences, Liberal Arts and Sciences, and Education.

Central has also designated by the Commission on Higher Education as National Centers of Excellence in Agricultural Education and Business Administration and National Centers of Development in Chemical Engineering, Electrical Engineering, Electronics Engineering and Teacher Education, where the university ranks first in the Western Visayas region (4th in the whole Visayas) in terms of the said number of designations. The Civil Engineering likewise on the other hand has also been designated by the Department of Science and Technology as Center for Civil Engineering Education for Western Visayas.

Academic units

Central's academic bodies consists of three graduate and professional school/colleges, eleven undergraduate colleges, the CPU Review and Continuing Education Center (a review and continuing education center), and four basic education schools. Central contains also a library system, Central Philippine University Press (CPU Press), three basic education schools, while the university's medical centers are located separately from the university.

CPU of eighteen schools and colleges that provides instruction in basic education all the way up to the post-graduate levels. In the undergraduate and graduate levels, its disciplines include Accountancy and Allied Accounting Studies, Advertising, Agriculture, Arts, Biological Sciences, Business Administration, Chemistry, Computer Studies, Digital Media and Interactive Arts, Economics, Engineering Sciences, Entrepreneurship, Environmental Sciences, Hospitality Management, Law, Library Science, Mass Communication (Journalism), Medical Laboratory Science, Medicine, Nursing, Pharmacy, Lifestyle and Fitness Management, Political Science, Psychology, Public Administration, Real Estate Management, Rehabilitation Science, Religious Music, Social Work, Teacher Education, Theology and Tourism.

Central is one of the two leaders in the Visayas and Mindanao based on endowment fund with current endowment between Php 150–200 million, which is specifically for research, academic and other purposes. The university has more than 182 Endowment programs and with a total of 433 Endowment Funds that is still on-going.

Central Philippine University is one of few private higher educational institutions in the Philippines that have been granted full autonomous status by the Commission on Higher Education (CHED), the same government agency that accredited some of its programs as Centers of Development. CPU is also one out of few ISO certified educational institutions in the Philippines. ISO (International Organization for Standardization) is a network of the national standards institutes of 153 countries, on the basis of one member per country. The Bureau of Product Standards has been the Philippines representative to ISO, of which the said institute, has accredited the university as an International Organization for Standardization (ISO) certified institution.

The university college academic programs operate on a semester system in which the academic year is divided into two terms (Including Summer [March or April–May]): July to October, and November to April. The school year typically begins in late June or early July and ends in mid-April. However, the two basic education schools of the university: Elementary School and High School, runs on a non-semester system, but has a summer term classes, offered by each basic education schools. The Senior High School on the other hand operates in 2 semesters just like the college.

Presently, the university confers bachelor's, master's, and doctoral degrees all accredited by either PAASCU (a member of FAAP), ACSCU-AAI, ACSC-AAI, ATESEA and assisted by EDPITAF in its 18 schools and colleges.

The university grants Bachelor of Arts and Bachelor of Science degrees in more than 30 academic majors and including minors, in nine undergraduate Colleges. Programs offered in the undergraduate level are Liberal Arts and Science, Hospitality Management, Tourism, Theology, Engineering, Business and Accountancy, Information Technology, Library and Information Science, Pharmacy, Medical Technology, Mass Communications, Public Administration and Political Science, Nursing, Teaching Education, Multimedia and Advertising, Agriculture and Environmental Sciences.

The Agriculture, Engineering, Business and Accountancy and Teacher Education programs are CHED Centers of Excellence and Centers of Development.

Central ranks first among other universities in Western Visayas in Commission on Higher Education (Philippines) Centers of Development and Centers of Excellence List with six of the university programs designated by the Commission on Higher Education (Philippines) as Centers of Development and Excellence.

Recently, through international collaborations with other institutions in different countries has made CPU to offer like undergraduate degree in Business Administration and Accountancy programs especially at the Thai Nguyen University of Economics and Business Administration in Vietnam.

Higher education

The baccalaureate academic studies are offered and undertaken in the undergraduate schools and colleges of the university. The professional, graduate and post-graduate studies on the other hand, are undertaken in the university's graduate and professional granting degree academic units which include a wide array of master's, diploma and doctorate academic degree programs - social sciences, business, education, library and information science, information technology, English studies & communication, liberal studies, nursing, psychology/counseling, agriculture and engineering. The College of Medicine which is a professional degree granting school which offers Doctor of Medicine program, has undergraduate academic degrees attached under its arm, the Respiratory Therapy and Health, Fitness and Lifestyle Management (HFLM). The Juris Doctor (J.D.) and Master of Laws are offered under the College of Law.

The College of Dentistry which was opened in 1948, is one of the professional degree granting schools of Central. Due to the cost the university may cover for its expansion for a modern dental school, it was closed on March 31, 1954.

The tertiary education schools and colleges of the university include:

 The College of Agriculture, Resources and Environmental Sciences – established by Burl Slocum, an American agriculturist. It is the first government recognized agricultural school outside Luzon. It offers undergraduate or Bachelor of Science degrees in agriculture, Agricultural and Biosystems Engineering and Environmental Management. Accredited by PAASCU (Philippine Accrediting Association of Schools, Colleges and Universities) as Level II and is also the first and only agricultural school designated by the Commission on Higher Education (Philippines) as Center of Excellence in Agriculture in Western Visayas region. The College of Agriculture, Resources and Environmental Sciences has been also designated as CHED-NAFES provincial agricultural center for Iloilo and Panay.

 The College of Arts and Sciences – the liberal arts and sciences college of the university established in 1925. It offers courses in Mathematics, Mass Communications, Biology, Micro-biology, Languages, Literature and Humanities. Some of its academic programs are designated by the Association of Christian Schools, Colleges and Universities Accrediting Agency Incorporated (ACSCU-AAI) as Level III and Level IV.
 The College of Business and Accountancy – established in the 1935 as one of the oldest American established business schools in the Philippines. Originally named as the College of Commerce, it was changed to its present name during the Presidency of Juanito M. Acanto. It offers baccalaureate degrees in Accountancy, Accounting Technology, Advertising, Business Administration (majors in Business Management, Financial Management (Banking and Finance), Marketing Management and Entrepreneurship) and Real Estate Management. The school is also Level IV in accreditation in some of its programs by the Association of Christian Schools, Colleges and Universities (ACSCU-AAI). The College of Business and Accountancy is the only business school in the Western Visayas region that has been designated by the Commission on Higher Education (Philippines) as Center of Excellence in Business Administration. It is also the only business school with Level IV accredited (the highest level of accreditation for a program in the Philippines) programs in Panay.
 The College of Computer Studies –  established in early 2000, it is a CISCO Networking Academy and ORACLE Academic Initiative Partner computer college, it offers computing science baccalaureate programs in Computer Science, Digital Media and Interactive Arts, Information Technology and Library and Information Science.
 The College of Education – a Center of Development in Teacher Education designated by the Commission on Higher Education (Philippines) and an Association of Christian Schools, Colleges and Universities (ACSCU-AAI) Level III & IV accredited teachers college, it offers programs in Early Childhood Education, Elementary Education, Physical Education and Secondary Education (majors in English, Filipino, Mathematics, Science, Special Needs Education, Bachelor in Sports Match Analysis
 The College of Engineering – founded by Harland Francis Chandler Stuart, the 7th President of Central in 1936, it is one of the oldest engineering schools established by the Americans in the Philippines. It offers baccalaureate academic degrees in Chemical Engineering, Civil Engineering, Electrical Engineering, Electronics Engineering, Mechanical Engineering, Packaging Engineering and Software Engineering.  The Commission on Higher Education (Philippines) designated the college as a centers of development in Chemical Engineering, Electrical Engineering and Electronics Engineering (the only engineering school in the Western Visayas region and one of the few in the country with "center of development" designation). It is also named as Department of Science and Technology (DOST) Engineering school, Heat Transfer Facility and Center for Civil Engineering Education for Western Visayas region and is accredited by the Philippine Accrediting Association of Schools, Colleges and Universities. The college has various research and auxiliary centers under its umbrella which includes the CPU Affiliated Renewable Energy Center (serves the whole Western Visayas area which is funded jointly by the Department of Energy (Philippines)) and the CPU Philippine Center for Packaging Engineering and Technology, the first of its kind in the South East Asia (backed by the college's department of Packaging Engineering and the Department of Science and Technology (Philippines).) The college collaborates since 2012 in the fields of Transportation and Structural engineering research with De la Salle University. The college's programs of Bachelor of Science in Packaging Engineering and Bachelor of Science in Software are both firsts in the Philippines. The College of Engineering also ranks first among other engineering schools in the Western Visayas region based on licensure examinations and the only engineering with Commission on Higher Education (Philippines) Center of Development programs designation. It has been chosen by the Educational Development Projects Implementing Task Force (EDPITAF) as one of the ten resource-based schools of engineering in the country. The college also is one of the Priority Engineering Schools in Panay, a Department of Science and Technology (DOST) School, Center for Civil Engineering Education, and Heat Treatment Facility for Western Visayas. The college is Commission on Higher Education (Philippines) Centers of Development in Chemical Engineering, Electrical Engineering and Electronics Engineering.

 The College of Law – established in the 1930s and confers the Bachelor of Laws (LLB) degree. In 2012 later, the college changed the Bachelor of Laws program to Juris Doctor (JD) program. The Juris Doctor (JD) program of the College of Law is the first Juris Doctor (JD) program in any Law schools in the Philippines approved by the Philippine Legal Education Board. The College of Law in collaboration with San Beda College of Law offers Master of Laws (LL.M. ).
 The College of Medical Laboratory Science – a newly established college in 2017 with one academic degree offered under it, the Bachelor of Science in Medical Laboratory Science, it dates back its establishment when the said academic program was founded under the College of Arts and Sciences in the 1960s. The academic course from the college was folded along with the university's pharmacy program into when the College of Nursing was reorganized in 2014 as College of Nursing and Allied Health Sciences. In 2017, the College of Nursing stemmed into three separate colleges resulting for the medical laboratory science program to establish as College of Medical Laboratory Science.
 The College of Medicine –  established in 2003, is one of the youngest colleges and professional schools of the university. The Doctor of Medicine (M.D.) program was the sole academic program offered by the college but later the bachelor's programs of Respiratory Therapy and Health, Fitness and Lifestyle Management were added in the college.
 The College of Nursing – established in 1906 as the Union Mission Hospital Training School for Nurses by the American Presbyterian missionary and medical doctor Joseph A. Hall, the College of Nursing is the first nursing school in the Philippines. The school was incorporated from CPU–Iloilo Mission Hospital to the Central Philippine University after World War II and is thereafter up to the present, forming as one of the university's organic academic degree granting college. It offers baccalaureate degree in Nursing and graduate programs through the university's School of Graduate Studies. The school's milestones include producing the first three nursing graduates, the first topnotcher and the first nursing school to become the number one top-performing school all in the history of nursing profession, education and licensure examination in the Philippines. It was renamed to College of Nursing and Allied Health Sciences in 2014. It stemmed into three separate colleges in August 2017 namely the College of Medical Laboratory Science and the College of Pharmacy while the college left to revert its name to the College of Nursing.

 The College of Pharmacy – a re-established college in 2017 after the College of Nursing and Allied Health Sciences was re-organized into 3 colleges, it dates back its founding years after the World War II. The college offers Bachelor of Science in Pharmacy degree.

 The College of Theology –  the university's seminary, it was founded four months before the formal founding of Central's precursor, the Jaro Industrial School,  in October 1905, and is the oldest degree-granting unit of the university. It is also the first Baptist theological seminary in the Philippines. The College of Theology was later merged in 1924, a year after the Jaro Industrial School became a junior college in 1923. The college has two departments – Religion and Ethics and Music. It offers baccalaureate and certificate academic degrees in theology and sacred music while its graduate theological are offered through the School of Graduate Studies. The College of Theology is a member and accredited by the Association for Theological Education in South East Asia (ATESEA) and shares strong linkage with its sister theological seminary, the Silliman University Divinity School.
 The Lucio Tan College of Hospitality Management (Dr. Lucio C. Tan College of Hospitality Management) – the second youngest undergraduate and graduate academic degree granting college after the College of Medicine of Central. Forming as a part of College of Education, it separated and became Institute of HRM and Tourism in 2005. At present, it is named in honor of the famous Chinese-Filipino business tycoon Lucio C. Tan, whose endowment donation was responsible for the re-establishment of the college and expansion. Accredited by the Association of Christian Schools, Colleges and Universities, it offers undergraduate academic degrees in Hospitality Management and Tourism Management.
 The School of Graduate Studies – established during the Presidency of Linnea Nelson, first woman President of Central Philippine University. It offers graduate and post-graduate studies in Management (with majors in Public Management, Developmental Management, Business Management Tourism and Hospitality Management), Education (Doctorate, Master of Arts), Theology (Doctor of Ministry, Master of Divinity, Master of Ministry and Master of Theology), Public Administration, Master in Business Administration, Master in Business Administration major in Tourism and Hospitality Management, Master in Computer Science and Master of Science in Computer Science,  Master of Science in Guidance and Counseling, Master in Library and Information Science, Master in Library and Information Science major in Theological Librarianship, Master in Education major in Filipino (Non-Thesis), Master of Engineering (majors in Civil Engineering, Chemical Engineering, Electronics Engineering and Mechanical Engineering), Master in Engineering (majors in Engineering Education with specialization in Chemical Engineering, Civil Engineering and Mechanical Engineering) and Master of Arts in Nursing. The school is also accredited by the Association of Christian Schools, Colleges and Universities where some its programs as either in LEVEL III or IV designations. The graduate and post-graduate degrees offered are in partnership with their respective undergraduate colleges where they're specially designated.

Overseas extension programs

CPU through a joint collaborative academic linkages with foreign institutions abroad, has earmarked the university to offer and established overseas academic programs in its partner universities in Macau, South Korea, Vietnam, and China. The first successful collaboration of Central for its establishment of academic programs abroad is with the universities of Thai Nguyen University of Economics and Business Administration (TUEBA) and Thai Nguyen University (TNU) in Vietnam. Undergraduate and graduate academic programs jointly offered by CPU with both institutions include Business Administration and Public Administration (Doctorate in Management). Upon the graduation of the students of the said academic programs, they receive Central Philippine University and joint partner institutions academic diplomas and are automatically inducted as members of the CPU Alumni Association and the respective partner universities in they graduated.

Basic education

Central offers basic academic programs in Kindergarten, Elementary School, Junior High School and Senior High School. The university's two basic education departments, the Kindergarten and Elementary are both accredited by ACSCU-AAI as Level II while the Junior High School as Level III. The junior high school department of the university, except that it is Accredited by ACSCU-AAI as Level III, it is the only EDPITAF-assisted and DOST/ESEP Division Leader School by the Department of Science and Technology for Western Visayas. The Junior High School was also chosen as one of the few 15 Network High Schools in the Philippines.

The CPU Elementary School dates back its founding as precursor of Central in 1905. Same with the CPU Junior High School which was established in 1913, it was also served with William Orison Valentine as the founder and first principal. The elementary school offers complete elementary course from grade 1-6 while the junior high school grade 7-10 (both in regular and special science classes).

The university in accordance with new Kindergarten to 12 Basic Education program (K+12) by the Philippine government so that the Philippine educational system be aligned and par with the educational systems abroad like in the United States, Europe and other countries established the Senior High School department. The Senior High School department offers General Academic Strand (GAS) under the Academic track of the new Philippine K+12 (Kindergarten to 12 Basic Education program).

Library system

Central's main library, the Henry Luce III Library encompasses the university's library system, which is composed of departmental and college libraries of Theology, Business and Law, Graduate Studies, High School and the Elementary school. Currently, the Henry Luce III Library holds more than 200,000+ volumes including holdings of special collections like the 40,000 United Nations Documents, World War II Documents, American Studies Resource Center, Meyer-Asian Collection, Food and Agriculture Organization and Elizabeth Knox Sacred Music Collection.
At present, the Central Philippine University Library is the biggest library in Western Visayas (one of the largest in the Philippines) in terms of volumes and holdings.

The Henry Luce III Library's (main library) structure was built by virtue of a grant given by Henry Luce III, a known philanthropist, and elder son of the founder and editor-in-chief of Time Inc., through the Henry Luce Foundation. It has been designated by the Philippine National Statistics Office on April 20, 1997, as National Statistics Office (NSO) Information Center for Western Visayan region. Consortium with the Silliman University library and the Trinity University of Asia through ACCORD Library Interconnection started in 2000. CPU Library's formal linkage in December 2002 was started with LIBRARY LINK, based at the Filipinas Heritage Library (in Makati), on Filipiniana materials.

Through linkages, Central Philippine University Library is a depository of the United Nations and the Food and Agriculture Organization (FAO). The library is a regular recipient of library materials from international and local organizations and centers such as the United Nations Educational, Scientific and Cultural Organization (UNESCO), Population Council in New York, National Library of the Philippines in Manila, Australian Centre for Publication Acquired for Development (ACPAD), Population Information Network, and the International Rice Research Institute (in Los Baños, Laguna, Philippines). Through the library system's American Studies Resource Center (ASRC), the only for Western Visayas and one of the few in the Philippines, which is located in the main library (Henry Luce III Library), is also a regular recipient from the: Thomas Jefferson Information Center (where the library has the said and one of the only 13 such centers in the Philippines) in Manila, and the United States Information Service. The American Studies Resource Center (ASRC) helps/assists students who want to study in the United States through its Educational Advising Program. A Knowledge for Development Center, donated by the World Bank in consortium with the university was launched in 2008 The CPU World Bank – Knowledge for Development Center is one of the few such centers which are hubs for dialogue and research on development issues established by the World Bank in key cities around the country in partnership with leading state and private universities. The main library is also the Philippine Institute for Development Studies (PIDS) repository for Western Visayas.

Medical centers

CPU–Iloilo Mission Hospital serves as the university hospital of Central. The hospital is separate and distinct in entity which operates independently from the university with its own board of trustees and corporation. Although serving as community hospital in general, CPU–Iloilo Mission Hospital serves as a training, teaching and as a laboratory facility for various medical-related internship; off-campus classes programs of the university colleges and departments of Nursing, Medicine, Medical Laboratory Sciences, Pharmacy and other allied health sciences, while the College of Theology (for its chaplaincy program); and supports the whole medical needs of the whole university. the former President of the university, Juanito Maca Acanto, serves as the CPU–Iloilo Mission Hospital's chairman.

There is also the CPU Birthing Center which is located on the main campus that operates with medical and healthcare staff both from the university and CPU–Iloilo Mission Hospital. The CPU Birthing Center was built to serve the surrounding community exclusively for pregnant women. Central Philippine University also through its College of Nursing maintains a linkage with the Capiz Emmanuel Hospital in Roxas City, Capiz. The hospital was also founded by Baptist American missionaries in 1913 which serves at present as the university hospital of the Filamer Christian University.

Two other auxiliary medical/healthcare institutions of the university include the CPU Clinical Laboratory and CPU Kabalaka Reproductive Health Clinic also on the university's main campus (just like the CPU Birthing Center, both are staffed by healthcare workers serving the surrounding community).

CPU–Iloilo Mission Hospital sits on a 7.56 acres (3.0 hectares) of land in Jaro, Iloilo City. The 230–300 bed hospital's location is separate from the main campus of the university. It offers a wide array of comprehensive medical and allied health services available to the university's students and to the community in general. It was established in 1901 by Joseph Andrew Hall, a Physician and missionary under the Presbyterian Foreign Mission Board, to serve as a venue for the treatment of health care to the very poor, and has the distinction today as the first Protestant and American hospital in the Philippines.

The hospital transferred locations many times since its founding. First at Ledesma Street (Calle Amparo) as a small dispensary and at Iznart Street where the present Young Men Christian Association (YMCA) is currently located. The third and present site where the hospital stands, is a property bought by the American Baptist Foreign Mission Society in Jaro District in 1931.

The hospital pioneered nursing education in the country through the establishment of in its Union Mission Training School for Nurses in 1906, the first nursing school in the Philippines. After World War II, the school for nurses was transferred to Central Philippine University and eventually renamed as Central Philippine University College of Nursing. It also produced the first with three nursing graduates, and the first topnotcher and board passer in the history nursing education, licensure examination and profession in the Philippines.

Recent expansion of the hospital includes a 2-storey CPU-IMH Medical Education Training Center (CPU-IMH METC) for CPU's College of Medicine, 4-storey modern (IMH) Iloilo Mission Hospital Medical Arts Building and the 7-storey modernly designed Iloilo Mission Hospital Medical Center (IMH Medical Center) which will open in July 2020.

Research and extension 

The university, has an active research and extension program that cover various researchers and extension activities. Central collaborates since then with various national and local government agencies, non-profit organizations, international and local industries and institutions for research in different fields.

The university annually holds a Research and Development Week. In 2006, the Philippine Commission on Higher Education (Philippines) (CHED) awarded CPU Research Center research program as one of the 2006 Best Higher Education Institution (HEI) Research Program in the country and the lone awardee from Region 6. In 2011 also, the university received the Best Higher Education Institution Research Program Award and a Plaque of Recognition as 1st Regional Qualifier for Best Higher Education Institution Research Program (BHEIRP) by the said Philippine government agency for higher education, the Commission on Higher Education. The university is also identified and designated by Commission on Higher Education-National Agriculture and Fisheries Education System (CHED-NAFES) through its College of Agriculture, Resources and Environmental Sciences as the Iloilo-Provincial Institute 
for Agriculture, where being the host of the annual Regional CPU-Department of Agriculture (Philippines) Agri Research Fair and Exhibits.

Originally the CPU Research Center lodged as an integral part of the CPU Outreach Center. In 1998, it was separated with the CPU Outreach Center. It was established to coordinate the research activities of the different colleges and units of the university and to convene and facilitate the affairs of the University Research Committee (URESCOM). Since its inception in 1998, CPU Research Center was able to enhance the competency of students, faculty and staff members in conducting research and in applying and disseminating information and findings for the benefit of its constituency and the community. The university's Institutional Research Program (IRP), through the CPU Research Center, which provides undergraduate and graduate students, faculty and staff with research opportunities for personal and intellectual growth yielded 119 bounded research reports, 53 ongoing institutional researches, and more than 100 faculty and staff were involved in research projects in 2005–2008, and still expanding to this day. The capability building programs that were regularly conducted increased faculty involvement in research. One major indication that the CPU Research Center and CPU links with the industry and business sector has grown stronger was the signing of a memorandum of agreement between the CPU Research Center (URC) and the Iloilo Chamber of Commerce in 2003. The agreement was about CPU Research Center's role as the sole consultant, researcher or trainer for the Iloilo Chamber of Commerce.

Under the CPU Research Center, the university published two research journals – the Scientia et Fides and Patubas and one research newsletter – the CPU Research Newsletter. The Scientia et Fides: Journal of Multidisciplinary Research and Review is the official journal of Higher Education Publication of the university and is internationally refereed and publishes semi-annually in print and online platform through the university's website. Patubas research journal is a refereed multidisciplinary research journal that aims to provide a source of information in the areas of agriculture, natural resources and the environment; social sciences, humanities and the arts; physical and biological sciences; business and management; engineering, information and communications technology; education; health, nursing and medical education; alternative medicine; theology and biblical studies; institutional system and process management; and community baseline impact studies. The objective of the journal is to help education professionals and decision-makers disseminate information and learn from each other's work.

Patubas is an Ilonggo word for "product" or "fruit", a fitting description for this multidisciplinary research journal which is indeed, a product or fruit of labors of researchers or the "seekers" of the truth in its varied dimensions. Patubas is published once a year under the auspices CPU Research Center.

In 2008, Rolex Award for Enterprise awarded the university alumni, professor, inventor and agricultural engineer Alexis Belonio due to his creation of a low-cost and environment friendly invention of the rice husk stove. Engr. Belonio is the first Filipino awardee of Rolex Award for Enterprise that has resulted the establishment of the Center for Rice Husk Energy Technology (CRHET) (Iloilo Rice Husk Center) at Central. The research center is attached to the College of Resources and Environmental Sciences and since it was established, it focuses on various technologies that will be developed and the utilization of rice husks as fuel and clean energy for cooking. The CPU Center for Rice Husk Energy Technology (CRHET) obtained funding from the Rolex Awards for Enterprise 2008.

CPU is also the Department of Energy (Philippines) Affiliated Renewable Energy Center (CPU-AREC) for Western Visayas.  The center is one of the most active among the 14 such in the whole Philippines and is funded by the Philippine Department of Energy and the university where it aims to provide research, extension, education for renewable energy with outreach programs and projects to electrify isolated and non-isolated places in Western Visayas region.

The university also has a Rockefeller Endowed Soils Analysis and Testing Laboratory. The university is also the sole Department of Science and Technology heat transfer facility for Western Visayas and collaborates since 2012 with De la Salle University in the fields of transportation and structural engineering research through the Central Philippine University College of Engineering.

Through the College of Engineering also, the CPU Philippine Center for Packaging Engineering (CPU PC-PET), a packaging testing center and laboratory facility which is the first of its kind in the Southeast Asian region was established in 2012, in which Central gain attention in the fields of science and technology and breakthrough for Packaging Engineering research and development in the country and South East Asia. The center is backed by the Department of Science and Technology, the Packaging Institute of the Philippines and a private sector's packaging advocate, Systemat-PackEDGE.

As the Western Visayas region is the leading producer of Native Chickens in 2011 in the Philippines, the university's created a partnership with the Philippine Department of Agriculture along with its College of Agriculture, Resources and Environmental Sciences for the research and development of Philippine Native Chicken in the country through the establishment of the CPU Center for Research, Technology Development and Commercial Production of Philippine Native Chicken. The research facility or center is the largest research station for Philippine Native Chicken in the Philippines, it is located separately from the main campus and occupies the entire 7 hectare CPU Experimental Farm in the town of Leon, Iloilo. The center is facilitated by the Western Visayas Agriculture and Resources Research and Development Consortium (WESVARRDEC) and funded by the said government agency (Department of Agriculture) and the Philippine Council for Agriculture, Aquatic, Forestry and Natural Resources Research and Development (PCAARRD).

The endeavor of the research and development of the Philippine Native Chicken through the CPU-CARES Research Station for Philippine Native Chicken made Dr. Jaime Cabarles, the CPU College of Agriculture, Resources and Environmental Sciences dean and head of the research facility the 2014 Commission on Higher Education (Philippines) Republica Award National Winner in Natural Sciences and Agriculture category, due to his significant contribution as researcher (Research and Development of Philippine Native Chicken) to Natural Sciences and Agricultural research in the Philippine society.

Other research and auxiliary centers and extension programs of the university includes the CPU Center for Ideation, Realization and Commercialization (CPU CIRAC or CPU TechHub), CPU Research and Developmental Learning Center (Building), CPU Center for Local Governance and Indigenous Peoples Studies; CPU-World Bank Knowledge Development Center (CPU WB-KDC); CPU Appropriate Technology Center (CPU-APPROTECH); CPU Crop Research Laboratory; and the CPU – Social Science Research Institute.

Cultures and traditions

Central Spirit
"Central Spirit" which has purportedly served as "a social glue", is a term for camaraderie, unity or reminisce the fond school day memories and activities at Central that has become symbolic of the bond that unites Centralians. Central Spirit is also contrast to what Central was founded for over a century before by the American missionaries and the school's vision. Moreover, there is also a song titled "Central Spirit" which was composed by one of the school's former American presidents, Dr. Francis H. Rose.

Scientia et Fides
Central's motto: Scientia et Fides literally means Knowledge and Faith in English. It was chosen by the third head of Central, the late American clergyman Dr. Francis Howard Rose, as contrast and coincides to the institution's Christian foundation and belief, which was founded by the pioneer, The Rev. William Orison Valentine.

"Scientia" –    Science is viewed from the standpoint of Christian understanding that God is the creator and sustainer of everything. Science is an avenue where one would know, understand, and appreciate the scope of God's handiwork as well as explore the magnitude of its potentials for the good of mankind.

"Fides" – Faith is basically a gift from God. And as a gift, the exercise of such faith will find meaning and purpose within the sphere of God's sovereign plan and direction. In this regard, such kind of faith becomes active and dynamic. It inspires, influences, and transforms anything that comes in contact with as it continually seeks understanding and expresses itself in noble actions that aim to glorify God.

Gold and Blue

Gold and blue are both official and athletic colors of Central since it became a Junior College in the early 1920s.  Gold regards to its "Scientia" motto as "Excellence" and contrast to the Biblical standpoint along with blue for "Spirituality" (from its "Fides" motto) when chosen as the official colors of Central in the 1920s. Both reference Biblical texts from the books and chapters of 1 Corinthians 3:12–13 and Ephesians 2:20 (for gold) and Numbers 4:6–7, 9,11, 12; 15:38–40 and Exodus 25:4; 26:1, 31, 36; 28:28, 31 (for blue).

CPU Derecho

Jaro CPU and Jaro CPU Ungka UI, Iloilo City's largest and famous jeepney routes traversing from Central's main campus as the terminal point to City Proper (Parola), has been in existence since the early years of the university.

CPU Derecho, literally means Direct to CPU marks the university's culture and its significant involvement with the Iloilo City community through a public transportation route named after it.

The government's plan to phase out the dilapidated and old traditional jeepneys in replace of a modern eco-friendly mini-bus type jeepney system, resulted for the Iloilo City government to adopt the said plan. The Jaro CPU and Jaro CPU Ungka UI are the first routes the city government rolled-out the initial units of modern jeepneys for public transportation use.

Festival of Lights and Music at Central

A month long-fete festival of lights and music which is an attraction every December for the Christmas season in the City of Iloilo, has become a tradition for more than a decade at Central, and is held annually since 1998.

The Christmas fest, which starts traditionally in the first week of December, is flocked by tourists especially on its opening night. A Christmas variety show by dance groups and colleges, a fireworks display, and musical sounds played by the CPU Symphonic Band are part of the festival's event on its opening.

Throughout the festival's duration which lasts until the three kings (January 6 of the next year), main campus major streets, trees and buildings are festooned with Christmas lights during the celebration. On the first or second Sunday of December few days after the opening night, a Christmas cantata concert is held by various chorale groups at the CPU Church. Several Christmas musicale and battle of the bands are showcased by the university's schools and colleges in venues like the Big Field or the CPU Alumni Promenade and Concert Park. A Christmas signing contest (Kantahan sa CPU), is also held and is open for contestants not only from the university but also for the surrounding community.

University and Foundation day
In 2015, although for many years the University Day festivity was celebrated in August until September, it was moved and combined with the Foundation Day that starts from September and ends in the first week of October. The festivity characterized with intramural games between colleges and schools that starts in September, the annual famous Mr. and Ms. CPU pageant, a university picnic and concerts at the Promenade (Alumni Promenade and Concert Park). At the last days of the celebration is the Foundation day which is held every October 1 where the university commemorates its founding by the American missionaries as the Bible School and Jaro Industrial School, Central's two forerunner schools in 1905. The commemoration characterized also with a civic parade, a memorial service for the founding father of Central William Valentine and his co-founders, the traditional singing of the Star Spangled Banner along with the raising of the flag of the United States and the Philippines.

Nursing Pinning, Capping and Candle Lighting ceremonies

The  Nursing Capping and Candle Lighting Ceremony is a unique tradition pioneered College of Nursing has pioneered which was later followed by some nursing school in the Philippines. The tradition dates back in the early years when the college was founded in 1906 as the Union Mission Hospital Training School for Nurses. Held at the end during the junior year of the nursing students at Rose Memorial Auditorium, the tradition involves students donning their CPU-Iloilo Mission Hospital nursing uniforms, the lighting up of candles and the placement of a nursing cap on the heads of women nursing students.

The Pinning ceremony on the other hand happens before the commencement exercises of a graduating nursing students. A Centralian Nurse Pin is bestowed upon the graduating student nurses in the said ceremonial tradition. It symbolizes that the student nurse has satisfactorily completed her training and is now ready to work as a professional nurse. The Directors of the Nursing Service of the different affiliated hospitals which includes the university's hospital CPU-Iloilo Mission Hospital as well as the college's faculty members present the pin to the graduating nurses. The design of the pin bears the logo of the college. The pin is a circle enclosed in laurel leaves which symbolizes excellence and the university's vision of Exemplary Christian Education for Life (EXCEL).

Each Centralian nurse is called to serve the profession with excellence and to embody the Christian ideals taught by the Alma Mater. The upper half of the other circle burst the word "Iloilo Mission Hospital" to signify the roots of the college – the Union Mission Hospital (Iloilo Mission Hospital) Training School for Nurses, the first nursing school in the Philippines. The lower half of the circle bursts the word "Nursing" to signify the profession. The inner circle has the acronym CPU which stands for Central Philippine University, the Alma Mater. The pin is made in gold and with the letters, CPU, in blue, the two being the colors of the university. The tradition has been also pioneered by the college which other schools of nursing education followed.

Athletics

Central is member of the Private Schools Athletic Association (PRISAA) and the Philippine University Games (UniGames). The university's athletic nickname, Golden Lions represents the university in athletic games.

The Golden Lions which was adopted as the varsity teams monicker through a proposal by the Reverend Francis Neil G. Jalando-on, Coach of the College Table Tennis Teams and Associate Pastor of the University Church, is based on the following Bible verses in contrast as the university was founded by the American Baptist missionaries: (Proverbs 28:1) "The godly are as bold as lions", (Proverbs 30:30) "The lion, mighty among beasts, does not retreat from anyone", (2 Samuel) 17:10 "The bravest are those whose heart is like the heart of a lion", (Revelation 5:5) "The Lion of the tribe of Judah, the Root of David, has triumphed" — JESUS is the Lion of Judah.

Central has adequate playgrounds and facilities for sports and athletic activities.

The CPU Gymnasium (Central Philippine University Gymnasium) is the largest university and athletic gymnasium in Western Visayas and can serve as a venue for the following sports: basketball, sepak takraw, badminton, table tennis, lawn tennis, and volleyball. CPU Gymnasium has also can host musical, live and band concerts. The CPU Gymnasium been the official home of the official athletics team of Central and is called The Lion's Den, the CPU Golden Lions. Outdoor sports such as soccer and softball can be played at the football grounds, CPU Softball Field and the ground situated at the Half-moon Drive.

The university hosted the 14th Philippine University Games (UniGames). There is also an Olympic size CPU swimming pool for swimming competitions. The university main campus can accommodate Triathlon sports event. The University Tennis Courts is also available for use by students and tennis enthusiasts. CPU's Olympic-sized swimming pool is the most modern and biggest school-based pool in Western Visayas. It provides a very convenient swimming poll for PE students, athletes, alumni and friends of CPU. Central Philippine University is famed for its football games.

The CPU International Football Team, composed of foreign students who are studying at Central played against the Philippine Football Federation team (Azkals) in 2010 in Barotac Nuevo, Iloilo. Most football players of Central are under the roster of Stallion F.C., a club that plays for the United Football League (UFL) and is also affiliated with Iloilo F.A. (IFA). CPU also hosted the PFF Smart Club Championship-Group B on August 9–13, 2011 which was facilitated by Iloilo Football Association wherein the university is one of the hosts venue.

In April 2012, the Western Visayas (PRISAA) Private Schools Athletic Association – Softball team, composed wholly and represented by Central's Softball team, defeated the regional teams including the last contingent (Region 10) and wins second time since 2011 with the gold medal in the 59th National PRISAA Championship. The 59th National PRISAA was held in Cebu City in 2012.

Student life

Student organizations
Students are encouraged to form groups that enhance their desire for study. The Student Organization Committee (SOC) acts as the regulatory body for all student campus organizations. It approves the registration and supervises the activities of student campus organizations. These include religious and cultural groups, academic and athletic clubs and groups. Notable organizations are: Central Philippine University Republic (CPU Republic), official student governing body of the university (the first student government in the Philippines); CPU Parliamentarian Society; the Central Echo; CPU Bahandi Singers; CPU Handbell Choir (the first and only 5-octave handbell choir in the country); and CPU Mountaineering Society. There is also a Foreign Students' Organization that assists the university to invite more foreign students to attend Central.

Fraternities and sororities
There are more than 10 fraternities and six sororities that are local, international or founded in the university that maintains their chapters at Central, as well as fraternity for those who are taking a Juris Doctor (J.D.) course, the Order of Kalantiao, and Phi Beta Epsilon for the students of the College of Engineering.

Student and faculty housing

Various apartment facilities, such as dormitories and housing commons, are located on the university's main campus that could provide living accommodations to students. The Franklin Hall (men's dormitory) and Weston Hall (women's dormitory) are the two known residential commons that can accommodate a total capacity of 300–400 students. The Anna V. Johnson Hall (Johnson Hall), a former edifice which houses the College of Theology, is now a residential commons exclusively for the students of the said seminary. Other residential halls for Central students include the Roselund Hall (Roselund Hostel), the Gonzaga Hall (Gonzaga Mansion), the Executive House, and the Missionary Hall. The Missionary Hall is the latest addition to the university's expansion of building residential commons on the main campus to cater its growing number of students.

The American Village, a residential village located within the premises of the university's campus, has also renovated halls and housing units catering to the growing demand of foreign students who are studying at Central. The village has also residential units for the university faculty and staff.

There's also two residential villages located separately from the university's main campus in Jaro – The CPU Centennial Village, a  residential village for the university's faculty and staff members has 185 saleable units with 6 types of housing models; and the CPU FA Heritage Ville Subdivision/CPU Heritage Subdivision, another residential subdivision of the university located few kilometers away east of the CPU Centennial Village in Anilao, Pavia, Iloilo, which just like the latter, also provides residential housing units with community amenities for the faculty and administrative staff of the university.

Living in the dormitories and villages is considered a privilege that is granted to the students and faculties who comply with the rules and regulations of the university. Formal admission procedures is followed before admitting anyone to the dormitories. For university villages, the housing units are given by the university to the faculty members and staff.

Publications
The Central Echo (CE) is the official student publication of CPU. It was founded in 1910, five years after Jaro Industrial School opened. Established originally as The Hoe, The Central Echo evolved to be one of the best college student publications in the Western Visayas region: It has been recognized as Second Best Magazine and Fifth Best Newspaper by the Philippine Information Agency-Region 6 in 2009. Central Echo publishes and circulates newspaper twice in a regular semester, it publishes magazine also, an art portfolio (Paraw) and a summer literary folio every summer. Other publications of the university include The Centralite, the official yearbook; The Central Post, the official publication of the office of the university president; and the Central High Echo, the official publication of the High School Department.

Every college in the university has its own publication. Some of the student writers are associate members of the Iloilo Press Club and the College Editors Guild of the Philippines.

Notable alumni

People associated or affiliated such as students, faculty members, administrators, honorary degree holders, or other people with Central are called Centralians. The university maintains an alumni association with various chapters throughout the country and abroad.

Central has produced or is associated with notable people as its alumni who became distinguished in their respective fields. This includes Ferdinand Marcos (the 10th President of the Philippines), Rodolfo Ganzon (the first popularly elected Mayor of Iloilo City and former Philippine Senator) Jovito Salonga (Filipino Senator), Franklin Drilon (Filipino Senator who also served as the President of the Senate of the Philippines), and Claro M. Recto (former Filipino Senator).

Legal luminaries in the national Philippine judiciary include Calixto Zaldivar (former Associate Justice of the Supreme Court of the Philippines, Congressman, Governor of Antique province and executive secretary of the President of the Philippines), Renato C. Dacudao (Associate Justice of the Court of Appeals of the Philippines), Lily V. Biton (Associate Justice of the Court of Appeals of the Philippines), and Reynato Puno (22nd Chief Justice of the Supreme Court of the Philippines).

In the field of business and industry, John D. Rockefeller (main benefactor of Central Philippine University and American business magnate and philanthropist widely considered as the richest person in US history and the richest person in modern history), Lucio C. Tan (Chinese-Filipino business tycoon), Alfonso A. Uy (Chinese-Filipino businessman, former and first President of Federation of Filipino Chinese Chambers of Commerce & Industry from the Visayas and Mindanao, and recipient and awardee of the Dr. Jose Rizal Award for Excellence in Business and Commerce), and Felix Tiu (Chinese-Filipino hotel and resorts business magnate), are included as alumni of Central.

Distinguished alumni as presidential cabinet members or secretaries of national government agencies include Perfecto R. Yasay, Jr. (Foreign Affairs Secretary of the Philippines, SEC chairman of the Philippines (1995–2000) and 2010 Philippine Vice-Presidential candidate), Leonor Briones (National Treasurer and Secretary of the Department of Education (Philippines) under the administration of Philippine President Rodrigo Duterte), Gregorio Licaros (fourth Governor of the Central Bank of the Philippines from 1970 to 1981), Rene Cartera Villa (former acting chairman of Local Water Utilities Administration of the Philippines), Nielex Tupas (public servant, politician and Chief Operating Officer and executive director of the National Youth Commission of the Philippines)), Peter Irving C. Corvera (Department of the Interior and Local Government (DILG) – Philippines Undersecretary for Public Safety and Presidential Medal of Merit (Philippines) awardee), Hansel Didulo (Assistant Secretary of the Department of Agriculture (Philippines)), Edward Dy Buco (Deputy Commissioner of the Bureau of Customs (Philippines)), Hope Hervilla (Assistant Secretary of the Department of Social Welfare and Development), and Rex Estoperez (Spokesperson for the National Food Authority).

In the national legislation and local governance, it includes Estrellita B. Suansing (Nueva Ecija 1st District congresswoman), Arthur Defensor, Sr. (Governor of Iloilo province), Ferjenel Biron (former Congressman of Iloilo's Fourth District and author of the cheaper medicines bill), Pablo Nava III (Congressman (Append Partylist)), Hernan Biron, Jr. (Iloilo fourth district), Richard Garin Jr. (Iloilo first district congressman and former Vice-governor of Iloilo Province), Daisy Avance-Fuentes (former assemblywoman and present Governor of South Cotabato), Salvacion Z. Perez (former congresswoman candidate and Governor of Antique Province), Edgar T. Espinosa Jr. (Congressman representing the province of Guimaras), Horacio Palma Suansing (Sultan Kudarat 2nd District congressman), Conrado Norada (Governor of Iloilo Province), Ramon Duremdes (Vice Governor of Iloilo Province), Christine Garin (Vice Governor of Iloilo Province), Joshua Alim (Iloilo City councilor and 2019 Philippine Elections Iloilo City congressman political bettor), Jed Patrick Locsin Escalante-Mabilog (former mayor of Iloilo City and World Mayor Award finalist from the Philippines),
and Jerry P. Treñas (former congressman and mayor of Iloilo City).

Notable alumni in foreign service as diplomats include Leo Tito Ausan Jr. (Philippine Ambassador to Bangladesh, Sri Lanka and the Maldives, Assistant Secretary for Legal Affairs of the Department of Foreign Affairs (Philippines), and former Philippine Consul General to Germany and Saudi Arabia) and Enrique Zaldivar (former congressman and Philippine Ambassador to Brunei).

The university's presence in the academia, science and technology, and renowned award giving institutions such as Ramon Magsaysay Award (Asian Nobel Prize), is widely known with its alumni as laureates, fellow or awardees. It includes Jose V. Aguilar (the first Filipino recipient of the Ramon Magsaysay Award (Asian equivalent of Nobel Prize) and also first awardee of the said award (Ramon Magsaysay Award) for Government Service category for his work as the "Father of the Community School Movement". He served also as a consultant on Elementary education and later to the UNESCO Consultative Mission to the Philippines), Gilopez Kabayao (Ramon Magsaysay Award laureate (Asian equivalent of Nobel Prize), renowned musician (international violin virtuoso), and patriarch and member of the musical family, The Kabayaos in the Philippines), Alexis Belonio (Filipino inventor, engineer, scientist and the first Filipino Rolex Award for Enterprise awardee. He was included also by the Rolex watchmaking company on its list of 10 model innovators in November 2008. He is also one of the first seven modern day Filipino heroes awardees and recipient of the first ever Yahoo! Philippines Pitong Pinoy Awards in 2011 and part of the 25 Heroes for Better during the 25th anniversary of the Western Union Philippines), 
Felipe Landa Jocano (historian and dubbed as the first and foremost Filipino Anthropologist),
and John Elmer Loretizo (inventor and 2017 grand winner of National Geographic's "Everyday Genius").

Fulbright scholars and professors-in-residence includes Betty Triño Polido (Nursing educator and Fulbright scholar), Edwin Helwig (Fulbright professor (1950-1951)), Robert Jelliffe (Fulbright professor (1950-1951)), Earl Glenn (Fulbright professor (1952-1953)), Morris Fender (Fulbright professor (1959-1960)), Howard Sengbusch (Fulbright professor (1962-1963)), Irving Boekelheide (Fulbright professor (1964-1965)), Robert Hopkins (Fulbright professor (1966-1967)), Deforest Palmited (Fulbright professor (1967-1968)),
and Chester Hunt (Fulbright professor (1975-1976)).

Alumni as National Artists of the Philippines includes Ramon Muzones (Hiligaynon fictionist and writer. 2018 National Artist of the Philippines for Literature awardee (first Hiligaynon writer awarded as National Artist for Literature)) and Leonor Orosa-Goquingco (National Artist of the Philippines for Dance, Mother of Philippine Theater Dance and Dean of Filipino Performing Arts Critics. She was the first Filipina and the only dancer sent on the first-ever cultural mission to Japan (1939) and the first Philippine folkloric ballerina or ballet dancer).

Prominent Centralians in military service include Major General Stephen P. Parreño (Commanding General of the Philippine Air Force under President Ferdinand Marcos Jr.); Alexander Pama (retired Vice-Admiral of the Philippine Navy and Undersecretary of the National Disaster Risk Reduction and Management Council (NDRRMC) of the Philippines), Hector Tarrazona (former colonel of the Philippine Air Force, founding member of the Reform the Armed Forces Movement, 2010 senatorial candidate under Ang Kapatiran Party, and consultant/chief of the Airmen Examination Board at the Civil Aviation Authority of the Philippines), Ezra James Enriquez (former Chief of Staff of the United Nations Disengagement Observer Force (UNDOF) during the Golan Heights standoff in Middle East), Custodio Parcon Jr. (Philippine Navy Lieutenant Colonel and one of less than 20 graduates of the Philippine Military Academy to have awarded the prestigious Philippine Medal of Valor by the President of the Philippines), Elvegia Ruiz Mendoza ("first female General in the Armed Forces of the Philippines" and Florence Nightingale Awardee from the International Red Cross), and 
Ramona Palabrica-Go (United Nations Consul General and the first female General in the Philippine Army. Other than such position and distinction that she held, Go was also the first female military pilot, first female line officer, and the first female battalion commander in the Philippines).

In literature, journalism, and media, Danny Fajardo (the President and founder of the Philippine leading newspaper Panay News), Rosendo Mejica (renowned Ilonggo and Visayan journalist, educator, and labor leader who is considered as the Dean of Visayan Journalists and also established the longest Ilonggo existing newspaper in 1913, the Hiligaynon), Benigno Hinolan (writer of the first biography article of the Philippine national hero, Graciano López Jaena in 1923), Almatita Tayo (writer and Carlos Palanca Memorial Award for Literature awardee), and
Cherry Palma (news anchor-woman of TV Patrol Panay, a regional news show of ABS-CBN Corporation), are esteemed alumni of Central.

In pageantry, Louise Aurelio Vail (first Binibining Pilipinas winner to place as a semi-finalist (top 15) in the Miss Universe pageant in 1965. She is also included in the magic five of the said pageant (Miss Universe) in the said year also (1965)), and Maria Daziella Gange (Filipina beauty pageant, second winner of the Miss Filipinas Heritage and the second representative of the Philippines to the international pageant search Miss Heritage.  She is also hailed as the first winner of the Miss Filipinas Heritage who came from Visayas and Mindanao), both hailed as graduates of Central.

In the field of performing arts and entertainment, it includes Alienette Coldfire (Katchry Jewel Golbin) (third-place winner of the 11th season of La France a un incroyable talent (France's Got Talent)), Otoniel Gonzaga (internationally known music virtuoso and tenor singer), JM Bales (singer behind the hit-song "Magandang Dilag" and Tawag ng Tanghalan sa It's Showtime contestant), and Kaki Ramirez (Filipino actor).

Alumni as trailblazers in the medical and allied and health sciences include Phebe L. Pendon (first Filipino fellow of the American Association of Cardiovascular and Pulmonary Rehabilitation), Loreto D. Tupaz (considered as the pioneer and pillar of the nursing profession in the Philippines and hailed as the Florence Nightingale of the Philippines), Nicasia Cada (one of the first three graduate nurses of the Philippines who graduated in 1909), Dorotea Caldito (one of the first three graduate nurses of the Philippines who graduated in 1909), and Felipa De la Pena (Gumabong) (one of the first three nursing graduates of the country from Union Mission Hospital Training School for Nurses, now Central Philippine University College of Nursing, the first and oldest nursing school in the Philippines),

Prominent figures in sports and athletics include Jovelyn Gonzaga (Filipina volleyball athlete, member athlete and team captain of Philippines women's national volleyball team who played during the 2015 Southeast Asian Games in Singapore and Philippine Army Lady Troopers as an opposite hitter. She was named in 2013 as the Shakey's V-League Open Conference Most Valuable Player).

Other known Central alumni that created significance in various fields include Juan C. Orendain (first press secretary of Manuel Roxas, President of the Philippines), Lejo Braña (first Filipino Certified Professional in Packaging and the first Filipino and Asian to receive a prestigious award in the packaging community in the United States and worldwide in his election to the US Packaging Hall of Fame), Isabelo de los Reyes Jr. (Honoris Causa; fourth Supreme Bishop of the Philippine Independent Church, known as the "Father of Ecumenism in the Philippines"), and Pedro E.Y. Rio (the first Filipino Doctor of Education degree holder).

Notes and references

Notes

a.  The Baptist Training School was established in June 1905 while the Jaro Industrial School for boys was established on October 1, 1905. The Jaro Industrial School for boys later became a junior college in 1923 and was renamed Central Philippine College, and in 1924, the Baptist Training School merged and became part of the Central Philippine College. In April 1953, Central Philippine College attained university status and became Central Philippine University.

Further reading

References

External links

Central Philippine University Official website
Central Philippine University Library Main library
The Central Echo (Official student publication) website
CPU Research Center (URC)

 
Research universities in the Philippines
Association of Christian Universities and Colleges in Asia
Universities and colleges in Iloilo City
Graduate schools in the Philippines
Liberal arts colleges in the Philippines
Business schools in the Philippines
Nursing schools in the Philippines
Educational institutions established in 1905
Institutions founded by the Rockefeller family
National Historical Landmarks of the Philippines
Marked Historical Structures of the Philippines
1905 establishments in the Philippines